Section Eight (also known as Section 8) is a 2022 American action film directed by Christian Sesma and starring Ryan Kwanten, Dolph Lundgren, Dermot Mulroney with Scott Adkins, Mickey Rourke, and Justin Furstenfeld.

Plot
During the US war in Afghanistan, a Marine platoon was ambushed by the Taliban, leaving only Jake Atherton (played by Ryan Kwanten) and Captain Mason (Lundgren) as survivors. After being discharged, Jake works as a mechanic in an auto-shop owned by former gang member Earl. After dispatching a group of Mexican gangster who come to collect the debt Earl owes them, the gangsters come and slaughter his family in retaliation. Jake rushes at the nightclub where the gang members gather and kill them all. The leader of gang reveals that the reason he and his gang killed his family is because someone forced them to do so but Jake does not buy his explanation and executes him. 
 
Jake Atherton is pulled out of prison by Mason to be recruited by a secret organization called Section 8 which is sanctioned to “eliminate any threats, anywhere in the world.” The nearly two-minute-long trailer sees the group of assassins going on various missions including one to kill a senator. At this point Jake realizes the secret organization is not what it seems, establishing the main conflict of the story.
Jake is in the prison after avenging the murder of his wife and son, and while he has no remorse, Sam Ramsey seems to be determined to recruit him for the secret agency. Tom Mason is Jake’s former commanding officer and an ally guiding him through this mess. The trailer also establishes the only way for Jake to get out is by getting deeper into this conflict and turning against the people he’s working with.

Cast

 Ryan Kwanten as Jake Atherton
 Dolph Lundgren as Tom Mason
 Dermot Mulroney as Sam Ramsey
 Scott Adkins as Leonard Locke
 Mickey Rourke as Earl Atherton
 Robert LaSardo as Fresh
 Maurice Compte as US Attorney General Martin Savoy
 Geoffrey Blake as Senator Jim Graham
 Jessica Medina as Miss Martinez
 Justin Furstenfeld as Ajax Abernathy
 Dan Matteucci as FBI Agent
 Tracy Perez as Liza Mueller
 Kimi Alexander as Ashton Atherton
 Mary Christina Brown as Agent Morrow
 Paul Sloan as Roland Brunner
 Stephen Cyrus Sepher as Edward Grayson
 Robert Laenen as Enod Bacharav
 Zachary Michael Cruz as Landon

Production
The casting of Lundgren, Adkins and Kwanten was announced on October 20, 2021.  The casting of Mulroney and Furstenfeld was announced on October 29, 2021.  The casting of Rourke was announced in November 2021.

The film is in post-production as of October 2021.

Release

Theatrical
In July 2022, it was announced that RLJE Films and AMC+ acquired the rights to the film, which was released on September 23, 2022.

Reception

Critical response
In a negative review of the film, Ewan Gleadow wrote that the feature relied on "blind patriotism and villainous stereotypes" yet marked "the most minor improvements" in Christian Sesma's direction.

References

External links
 

American action films
2020s English-language films
2020s American films

fa:بخش ۸ (فیلم)